= Yantus, West Virginia =

Yantus
- Extinct town
- Interactive map of Yantus
- Coordinates: 37.9648219°N 82.0584635°W
- Country: United States
- State: West Virginia
- County: Logan
- Post office established: 1903
- Post office closed: 1937
- Named for: George Yantis

Yantus is an extinct town in Logan County, in the U.S. state of West Virginia.

== History ==
A post office called Yantus was established in 1903, and remained in operation until 1937. George Yantis, a local storekeeper and early postmaster, gave the community its name.
